Two Paths is the seventh studio album by Finnish folk metal band Ensiferum. It was released on 15 September 2017 through Metal Blade. It is the only Ensiferum album to feature accordionist Netta Skog, who replaced keyboardist Emmi Silvennoinen in 2016 and departed from the band in December 2017.

Track listing

Personnel

Band members
Petri Lindroos – harsh vocals, guitars, percussion, choir
Markus Toivonen – guitars, bouzouki, percussion, clean vocals, choir
Sami Hinkka – bass, dulcimer, percussion, clean and harsh vocals, choir
Janne Parviainen – drums
Netta Skog – acoustic and digital accordion, female vocals, choir

Guest members
Mikko P. Mustonen – orchestrations and orchestral arrangements
Lassi Logrén – nyckelharpa, violin
Vince Edwards – choir

Production
Mikael "Routa" Karlbom – photography
Gyula Havancsák – cover art
Anssi Kippo – producer

Charts

References

2017 albums
Ensiferum albums